The Serres Municipal Stadium is a multi-purpose stadium in Serres, Greece.It is currently used mostly for football matches and is the home stadium of Panserraikos and Ethnikos Gazoros.The stadium holds 9,500, was built in 1926 and renovated numerous times. The record attendance of the stadium was on 25 June 1972, when 14,200 spectators watched Panserraikos 1–1 draw against Larissa for the Beta Ethniki 1971–72 season last match, a result that gave the chance to Panserraikos to get the promotion to Alpha Ethniki.

External links
 Stadium info

Football venues in Greece
Multi-purpose stadiums in Greece
Buildings and structures in Serres